This is a list of residential buildings at Brigham Young University which includes residential halls, dining facilities, housing area offices, laundry facilities, and other buildings directly connected with the residence halls. Residential buildings at Brigham Young University include three single-student residence hall centers, a foreign language student residence facility, and married-student housing at Wymount Terrace.

Foreign Language Student Residence

Brigham Young University's Foreign Language Student Residence (FLSR) program was established in 1978 as a three-house off-campus residence center dedicated to the study of Russian and Italian. Due to the success of these houses, the program expanded from three houses to one specially-designed complex in 1991. Each apartment houses 6 students: 5 students who are studying the same language and a native speaker. Each student agrees to only speak the apartment's assigned language during the school year while in the apartment.

Today the FLSR consists of five buildings- four outer buildings with three floors each. These contain all of the male and female apartments for the program. The central building has rooms used for student activities, dinners, and Sunday church meetings. The on-campus complex consists of 25 individual apartments for men and women learning eleven different languages (depending on demand): Hebrew, Chinese, French, German, Italian, Japanese, Portuguese, Russian, Korean, and Spanish.

Helaman Halls

Helaman Halls, named after one of the Book of Mormon heroes of the Church of Jesus Christ of Latter-day Saints, was first opened for use in the Fall of 1958. The initial on-campus complex consisted of five residence halls, a central dining building, and an administration building. Construction costs were $5,300,000, and when completed the complex initially housed 1170 male students. The residence buildings were named after prominent LDS individuals and/or families, including the Hinckley Family, Stephen L. Chipman, David John, Thomas N. Taylor, and Walter Stover.

The dining building was christened the George Q. Cannon Building and at the time could accommodate 1,800 people. In addition, both a pool and a "recreation field," which includes eight tennis courts four softball fields, were completed for the use of residents. Two more residence buildings were already under construction when the completion of the original Helaman Halls Complex was announced on September 18, 1958. The two new buildings were opened for use in September 1959, and housed 234 women each, bringing the total occupancy number of the complex to 1638. In 1959, the semester rent for Helaman halls was approximately $23 per term. Another building was added in 1970, and a new hall was built in 2010.

From 1991 to 2003, buildings at Helaman Halls underwent a 12-year renovations project so that each room would have a sink and vanity.
Today, Helaman Halls has a total of nine residence buildings. with five buildings for women and four buildings for men. The Residence Halls are located on the northwest corner of campus. Living style consists of two students per room, with 22 rooms on each floor, with six floors (in three stories) per building. Helaman Halls currently has housing for just over 2,100 students. There are basic kitchen facilities in the basement lobby of each hall, but residents are required to purchase a meal plan. The majority of resident meals are eaten in the area central building- the Cannon Center. Because of its close proximity to the athletic facilities and all-you-can-eat dining, many Freshman athletes choose to live in Helaman Halls.

Notable individuals who lived at Helaman Halls include Mike Leach, Vai Sikahema, and Alema Harrington.

Heritage Halls

Heritage Halls were originally built in 1953. They were the oldest dorms on campus until they were torn down (see Previous Residential Facilities below) and replaced by the new Heritage Halls buildings. In order to make room for the new Heritage Halls buildings, the Deseret Towers "DT" apartment complex was also torn down from 2006 to 2008, and construction on the new buildings at the Heritage complex began in 2011.

Today, Heritage Halls is a complex of dorms that consists of 14 buildings, located on the East side of campus. In the summer of 2017, work was completed on a new central building and one additional dorm building, bringing the total capacity to about 2,750 students. Two additional dorm buildings are currently under construction.

The living arrangements in Heritage Halls are similar to those of an apartment. Students share a kitchen and a common area. Each of the L-shaped buildings houses about 210 students. They are 4 stories high and feature East Coast classic design. Activity rooms on each floor have pictures with Church history themes and have floor-to-ceiling windows that offer views of the surrounding area. The individual units feature full kitchens, bedrooms with individualized lighting systems, and hallway vanities.

The buildings in the Heritage Halls complex are as follows:

Wymount Terrace

Wymount Terrace is the family housing unit for married students and is located on the northeast side of campus. It consists of South Wymount (24 three-story apartment buildings) and North Wymount (48 two-story apartment buildings). The buildings are arranged in quadrangles that enclose lawn and playground areas. It is informally referred to as “the rabbit pen” by some students. This is possibly in reference to how fast families grow here. Wymount also has playground areas for children. Construction on the complex began in August 1961 by Tolboe and Harlin Construction Company. Each building has 462 apartments that range from one to three bedrooms. The complex sits on 27 acres.

Wyview Park

Wyview Park is a living complex for married and single students at BYU. The university had purchased 150 mobile home units to provide housing for married students until Wyview Park was built. Wyview was dedicated by James E. Faust. When the complex opened in 1998, it had a waiting list of 900 applicants which grew to 1,800 within a few months. 

The current complex includes 30 buildings which originally housed married student families, until the end of the summer of 2006, when the southern half of the residential park was converted into housing for singles and eventually the entire complex. In 2013 after the winter semester of school concluded, the northern portion of Wyview was converted into a makeshift Missionary Training Center (MTC) to help alleviate the overburdened Provo MTC just up the hill.  As part of this temporary MTC complex, the LDS church also obtained a lease for the Raintree Apartments across the street to the west and both facilities are used together to house missionaries and their training activities. The  complex now houses both married and single students.

Previous Residential facilities

Allen Hall
One of the earliest student dormitories at BYU, Allen Hall, named for Ray Eugene Allen and his wife Inez Knight, was built in 1938. Originally it was a men's dormitory, but during World War II, a large influx of female students caused the university to make it a women's dorm. In 1962, the building ceased to be a student dormitory altogether, and was used as temporary housing for missionaries while the Church's Language Training Mission was under construction. The success of Allen Hall led to immediate plans for another dormitory, Amanda Knight Hall, named for the wife of Jesse Knight. This served as a home for female students until it was also turned over to the Language Training Mission.

BYA Boarding House
The BYA Boarding House was established in 1885 with Joseph B. Keeler as steward and Willard Done as presiding tutor.  It had 24 residents in May 1886 but there is no record of it after that date.

Co-op Housing
In the years immediately after World War II BYU purchased several houses in Provo that it operated as co-operative residents before it was able to build resident halls on a large scale.  Most of these houses were for female students.

Deseret Towers
In 1965, BYU completed construction of Deseret Towers. At the time it consisted of five halls, but a sixth was added in 1969 and the final in 1978. Each building was six stories and the whole complex housed over 2,000 students. Deseret Towers was dedicated in October 1970 by Ezra Taft Benson. The residential  hall was referred to as "DT". In December 2006, V and W Hall were torn down because they didn't meet the electronic demands of students in the 21st century. After the winter semester the remaining buildings were used to hold conferences and did not serve as residential apartments anymore. They were demolished in 2008.

The following were halls at Deseret Towers:
 Ballard Hall (named after Melvin J. Ballard)
 Bennion Hall (named for Adam Samuel Bennion)
 Callis Hall (named for Charles A. Callis)
 Morris Center (named for George Q. Morris)
 Penrose Hall (named for Charles W. Penrose)
 Richards Hall (named for George Franklin Richards)
 Whitney Hall (named for Orson F. Whitney)

Old Heritage Halls

The original Heritage Halls complex was a twenty-four-building housing complex. Old Heritage Halls was completed in two stages: one stage of buildings were completed in 1953 and the other stage in 1956. The halls received their collective name through a contest among residents. All of the separate buildings were named after notable Latter-day Saint women.

There were 24 individual living buildings. The Heritage Halls buildings were built for unmarried females, although later on males were allowed to be residents. At one point a "Homemaking Apartment" was located in Heritage Halls, where students in the Department of Home Economics and Management of the Home took turns living a low-budget lifestyle for two weeks at a time. Each of the buildings had ten units capable of housing six people each. This residential hall offered apartment-style living with kitchens included in each unit. In between the buildings there was a canal that was known as "the moat." Many students chose Old Heritage Halls due to its proximity to campus. The old residence halls began to be torn down gradually in 2005.

Wymount Village
In 1946, during the postwar BYU growth, President McDonald purchased forty-eight buildings from a nearby Air Force station in order to house students. These buildings were called Wymount Village, and housed both married and single students until 1962. Wymount Village was replaced by Wymount Terrace in that year, intended solely for students with young families. The 24 building complex contains a total of 462 apartments of varying sizes.

Wyview Village
This was another set of housing units purchased from the Federal Government.  It was 150 pre-fabricated homes intended for Mountain Home Air Force Base.  The units were practically new, with new appliances and many had never been lived in.  They were sold as surplus by the government in October 1956, moved to Provo early in 1957 and ready for occupation by August 1957.  They were located north-east of the present site of the Marriott Center.

References

Further reading
Ernest L. Wilkinson., ed., Brigham Young University: The First 100 Years. Provo: Brigham Young University Press, 1975. 4 Volumes.

External links

 Foreign Language Student Residence Homepage
 Gender map of Helaman Halls
 Photograph of Wymount Terrace in the 1960s
 Article about Foreign Language Housing in The Daily Universe
 Photograph of Helaman Halls, ca. 1958
 Photograph of Heritage Halls and Wymount Village, UA P 2 Series 1 at L. Tom Perry Special Collections, Brigham Young University 
 Photographs of Wyview Village

Brigham Young University buildings